Margaret Bannerman (born Marguerite Grand; December 15, 1896 – June 14, 1976) was a Canadian actress. She is known for her work in the English films The Gay Lord Quex, Lady Audley's Secret and Hindle Wakes. She had a successful career on stage, appearing in revues and light comedy.

Early life
Bannerman was born in Toronto, Ontario on December 15, 1896 to parents Charles Grand and Margaret Hurst. She attended Bishop Strachan School in Toronto, then the Mount Saint Vincent Academy in Halifax, Nova Scotia. The family moved to England at the outbreak of World War I.

Theatre
Grand began her career in English theatre in 1915 in Charlotte's Revue starring Gertrude Lawrence. During the silent age she appeared in several English comedy films. A high point of her acting career was the part of Lady George Graystone in Somerset Maugham's Our Betters, which ran for 548 performances at the Globe Theatre in London, England. A nervous breakdown in 1925 interrupted her acting career. After a year of touring Australia and New Zealand  in 1928, she returned to London theatre before moving to the United States in the 1930s. She returned to acting in film in the 1930s, attempting to break into American films. She appeared in films until 1947 and continued in theatre until 1963.

Bannerman performed professionally twice in her hometown, firstly in 1940 in Our Betters at the Royal Alexandra Theatre. She made one final performance in her hometown in November 1963, as Mrs. Higgins in the touring company of My Fair Lady. She then retired to an actor's home in Englewood, New Jersey where she continued her life-long interests in furniture and antiques.

Personal life
Bannerman was married twice, to London producer Anthony Prinsep and actor Pat Somerset. In March 1929, Bannerman was in Melbourne where the Australian and English cricket teams where playing the fifth Test match for The Ashes. England's Jack Hobbs became the oldest player to score a Test century, at the age of 46 years and 82 days, with Bannerman congratulating Hobbs with a kiss.

Selected filmography

 Justice (1917) - Miss Cokeson
 The Gay Lord Quex (1917) - Muriel Eden
 Flames (1917) - Cuckoo
 Mary Girl (1917) - Countess Folkington
 Hindle Wakes (1918) - Beatrice Farrar
 Goodbye (1918) - Florence Tempest
 Her Secret (1919) - Margaret Henderson
 Lady Audley's Secret (1920) - Lady Audley
 The Grass Orphan (1922) - Mrs. St. John
 Two White Arms (1932) - Lydie Charrington
 Lily Christine (1932) - Mrs. Abbey
 Over the Garden Wall (1934) - Diana
 The Great Defender (1934) - Laura Locke
 Royal Cavalcade (1935) - Undetermined Minor Role (uncredited)
 I Give My Heart (1935) - Marechale
 Cluny Brown (1946) - Lady Alice Carmel
 The Shocking Miss Pilgrim (1947) - (scenes deleted)
 The Homestretch (1947) - Ellamae Scott

References

External links

 

1896 births
1976 deaths
Canadian film actresses
Canadian silent film actresses
20th-century Canadian actresses
Actresses from Toronto
Canadian expatriate actresses in the United Kingdom